Oddjob is a comic book series published by Slave Labor Graphics and created by Ian Smith and Tyson Smith, featuring Moe, Investigator of the Odd. The comic is an action/humor series with absurdist tendencies. Oddjob was published in bimonthly from Spring 1999-May 2001. All eight issues  (and an additional story) were collected in a trade paperback by Slave Labor in 2003.

Characters 
Moe is assisted by the failed clown Robin and a former baseball player Moose Mulligan, who owns the bar The Spittoon (the base of their operation). Some of their adversaries include Amish cyborg, sloths and living gummi men.

Slave Labor Graphics titles
1999 comics debuts
2001 comics endings